Radslavice refers to the following places in the Czech Republic:

 Radslavice (Přerov District)
 Radslavice (Vyškov District)
 Horní Radslavice